The West Entrance Station at Glacier National Park was built by the Civilian Conservation Corps in 1942.  An example of the National Park Service Rustic style, it was designed by the National Park Service Branch of Plans and Design.

The entrance station was designed at National Park Service architect Albert Good's suggestion to specifically resemble a toll station. The station is a wood-frame building faced with random ashlar stone. The roof is framed using logs., supported by  log posts. The entrance station is similar to that built at the park's Saint Mary entrance at about the same time, using the same plans. A 1963 modification added two checking booths with board-and-batten siding under the wings of the station.

The West Entrance Station was placed on the National Register of Historic Places on April 4, 1966.

References

Park buildings and structures on the National Register of Historic Places in Montana
Government buildings completed in 1942
National Park Service rustic in Montana
Civilian Conservation Corps in Montana
1942 establishments in Montana
National Register of Historic Places in Flathead County, Montana
National Register of Historic Places in Glacier National Park